Horn Island Airport  is an airport on Horn Island in the Torres Strait, Queensland, Australia.

World War II
The Civil Constructional Corps and the Department of Main Roads began construction of an advanced operational airbase on the island during World War II, commencing in 1940. RAAF Base Horn Island was completed in 1941 and was used as a staging base for Allied aircraft moving between Australia and New Guinea. The airfield consisted of two intersecting runways, with revetments for aircraft parking

Japanese bombing raids against Horn Island Aerodrome
After Darwin, Horn Island was the second-most bombed area of Australia by the Japanese in World War II.
 14 March 1942
 18 March 1942
 30 April 1942
 11 May 1942
 6 July 1942
 30 July 1942
 1 August 1942
 17 June 1943

Units based at Horn Island Aerodrome
 7th Fighter Squadron of 49th Fighter Group, March 1942 – 18 April 1942 (Curtiss P-40s)
 No. 6 Squadron RAAF
 No. 7 Squadron RAAF
 No. 24 Squadron RAAF
 No. 32 Squadron RAAF
 No. 75 Squadron RAAF
 No. 84 Squadron RAAF
 No. 28 Operational Base Unit RAAF

Memorial 
The Horn Island Veterans Memorial in front of the airport commemorates the American and Australian servicemen who fought and died in the defence of Horn Island and the Torres Strait during World War II. It was designed by Vanessa Seekee OAM and Gordon Cameron OAM from local materials.

Airlines and destinations

Aircraft crashes
Aero Commander, 500-S, VH-UJP
A number of B-17 Flying Fortresses crash landed during World War II:
 B-17E Serial Number 41-2636 – crashed during night take off 13 July 1942
 B-17E Serial Number 41-2655 – crashed during night take off 13 July 1942
 B-17E "G.I. Issue" Serial Number 41-2421 – crash-landed on 16 July 1942
 B-17E "Tojo's Nightmare" Serial Number 41-2497 – crashed attempting landing 24 March 1944
A survey aircraft operated by Adastra Airways Lockheed Hudson VH-AGO crashed on approach after an engine failure on Monday 24 June 1957. 6 fatalities including one child.

See also
 List of airports in Queensland

References

External links
Wartime Magazine article
Pacific War Wrecks database
Aviation Safety Investigation Report VH-UJP

Airports in Queensland
Airports established in 1941
Queensland in World War II